The Supernatural Tour was the thirtieth concert tour by American rock band Santana, supporting their 1999 album Supernatural.

Live releases 
Live material from this tour has appeared on the following releases:

 "Smooth" from February 25, 2000, at the Grand Olympic Auditorium in Los Angeles was used in the 2001 film All Access: Front Row. Backstage. Live!.
 Most of the set on April 8, 2000, at the Pasadena Civic Auditorium in Pasadena, California was featured on the 2000 video Supernatural Live: An Evening with Carlos Santana and Friends.

Touring personnel

Band:
 Carlos Santana – lead guitar, percussion, vocals
 Chester D. Thompson – keyboards
 Benny Rietveld – bass guitar
 Karl Perazzo – timbales, percussion, vocals
 Raul Rekow – congas, bongos, percussion, vocals
 Rodney Holmes – drums (through June 14, 2000)
 Billy Johnson – drums (beginning July 20, 2000)
 Tony Lindsay – lead vocals
 Andy Vargas – lead vocals (beginning September 1999)
 Vorriece Cooper – vocals
 William Ortiz – trumpet (beginning May 18, 2000)
 Jeff Cresman – trombone (beginning May 18, 2000)

Management:
 Kevin Chisholm – tour manager
 Adam Fells – assistant tour manager
 Mike Hoss Kiefer – production manager
 Andy "Lightman" Elias – lighting designer
 Chad Wilson – security

Production:
 Stan Elleflot - lighting director
 Brian Montgomery – monitors
 Randy Piotroski – foh sound
 Jason Ruggles – sound engineer
 Chad Koehler – stage manager/rigger
 CC Cooperstock – lighting tech
 Jake Murray – lighting tech
 Charles Cochran – lighting tech
 Timothy Cerola – video tech

Crew:
 Dave Crockett – drum & percussion tech
 René Martinez – guitar tech
 Dave Trouse – keyboard tech
 Chris "Stubby" McNair – bass tech

Typical set lists 

{{hidden
| headercss = background: #ccccff; font-size: 100%; width: 70%;
| contentcss = text-align: left; font-size: 100%; width: 70%;
| header = 2000
| content =
 "Spiritual" (Coltrane)
 "(Da Le) Yaleo" (Santana, Mutela, Polloni)
 "Love of My Life" (Santana, Matthews)
 "Put Your Lights On" (Schrody)
 "Day of Celebration" (Santana, Thompson, Lindsay)
 "Victory Is Won" (Santana)
 "Maria Maria" (Santana, Perazzo, Rekow, Jean, Duplessis)
 "Migra" (Santana, Rachid Taha, Lindsay)
 "Africa Bamba" (Santana, Touré Kunda, Perazzo)
 "Supernatural Thing" (Haras Fyre, Gwen Guthrie)
 "Corazón Espinado" (Fher Olvera)
 "Bacalao con Pan" (Valdes)
 "Make Somebody Happy" (Santana, Ligertwood)
 "Get It in Your Soul"
 "Black Magic Woman" (Green)
 "Gypsy Queen" (Szabó)
 "Oye Como Va" (Puente)
Encore
 "Apache" (Jerry Lordan)
 "Smooth" (Shur, Thomas)
 "Dame Tu Amor" (Abraham Quintanilla, Ricky Vela, Richard Brooks)
 "Jin-go-lo-ba" (Olatunji)
}}

Tour dates

North American leg (February 12, 1999 – January 1, 2000)

European leg (January 21–29, 2000)

North American leg (February 25 – April 19, 2000)

Japanese leg (April 22–28, 2000)

European leg (May 18 – June 14, 2000)

North American leg (July 20 – October 28, 2000)

Box office score data

Notes

References

External links 
 Santana Past Shows 1999 at Santana official website
 Santana Past Shows 2000 at Santana official website

Santana (band) concert tours
1999 concert tours
2000 concert tours
Concert tours of North America
Concert tours of Europe
Concert tours of Asia